Oncideres ulcerosa is a species of beetle in the family Cerambycidae. It was described by Ernst Friedrich Germar in 1824. It is known from Paraguay and Brazil.

References

ulcerosa
Beetles described in 1824